Solbergfoss Hydroelectric Power Station is a run-of-the-river hydroelectric power station on the Glomma, in Askim municipality, Viken county, Norway.

Construction of the power station began in 1913. It was operational in 1924. Solbergfoss is owned by E-CO Energi (64,4%) and Statkraft (35,6%).

Dam
Solbergfoss Dam is a concrete gravity dam.

Power station 
The hydraulic head is 21 m.

Solbergfoss I 
The power station contains 13 Francis turbine-generators. The total nameplate capacity is 108 MW. Its average annual generation is 350 GWh. Solbergfoss I was built from 1913 until 1924.

Solbergfoss II 
The power station contains 1 Kaplan turbine-generator. The total nameplate capacity is 100 MW. Its average annual generation is 550 GWh. Solbergfoss II was built from 1979 until 1985.

External links

References

Dams in Norway
Hydroelectric power stations in Norway
Gravity dams
Dams completed in 1924
Energy infrastructure completed in 1924
1924 establishments in Norway